Alenquer is a municipality in the state of Pará in the Northern region of Brazil. The town is located on the northern bank of the Amazon River, roughly across from the city of Santarém.

The city is served by Alenquer Airport.

Conservation

The municipality contains roughly half of the  Mulata National Forest, a sustainable use conservation unit created in 2001.
The north of the municipality contains part (13.31%) of the  Grão-Pará Ecological Station, the largest fully protected tropical forest conservation unit on the planet.
It contains 2% of the  Trombetas State Forest, created in 2006.

Notable people
 Delival Nobre (b. 1948), sports shooter

See also
List of municipalities in Pará

References

Municipalities in Pará